Tunis Governorate is the smallest and most populated of the twenty-four governorates (provinces) of Tunisia. It covers an urban and suburban area on the Gulf of Tunis on the north-east coast covering  and has a population of 1,056,247 (2014 census) with some agriculture and amenity land including parts of national parks. Its capital is that of the country, Tunis.

Physical geography and economy

The Tunis Governorate is the largest industrial center in the country. Opening on the Mediterranean Sea, the governorate has a Mediterranean climate with annual rainfall reaching 470 mm.  The area tapers towards the port and forms a narrow alluvial belt stretching westward, a distance of approximately 20 km2, taking in much farmland and two small freshwater lakes.  The Medjerda River rising in Algeria has its much-diverted mouths in this area and its natural mouth would have discharged into the saltwater harbour around which neighbouring provinces have quarters of the central metropolitan area of Tunis.  To the immediate south-west of the city centre is large freshwater lake, exceeding the size of the city centre fed by a distributive canal of the Medjerda.  Its banks includes cultivated land to the west and the small Foret de Sijoumi to the east, with suburbs largely to the other sides.  The urban area reaches over half of the length of the province.  A very large market and hospitals area in the west of the capital is supplemented by wide roads and flyovers as well as three of the country's largest railway stations to make for a highly developed city centre in terms of trade and connectivity.

The area includes a container-handling port including large ferries to Salerno, Civitavecchia, Genoa, Palermo and Trapani in Italy and to Marseille in France.  Its international airport and railway hub support its status as an established hub in hosting the government departments, stock exchange and major business headquarters of Tunisia.  Culturally its national and international museum, the Bardo Museum hosts relics from each of the historic periods of western Mediterranean civilization and important works of art often in the manner of the classics or early Islamic tradition.  This along with themed smaller museums and galleries, its mosques, souqs, traditional hotels, restaurants and nearby headlands, national parks and beaches make Tunis itself a major tourist destination.

Administrative divisions
Tunis Governorate is divided into twenty-one delegations, listed below with their populations at the 2004 and 2014 Censuses.

It includes eight municipalities:

References

 
Governorates of Tunisia